The Swan is a Grade II listed historic pub, lying immediately south-west of the city centre of York, in England.

The pub was built as a beer house and grocery in 1861, at the end of a terrace on Bishopgate Street, the northern extension of Bishopthorpe Road.  In 1899, it was purchased by the Joshua Tetley's & Son brewery, which in 1936 decided to remodel the pub.  The redesign was executed by the Leeds architecture firm Kitson, Parish, Ledgard and Pyman, and it survives largely intact.

The design centres on a large drinking lobby, with two rooms leading off, the public bar to the front and the grander smoke room to the rear.  Each has a hatch for bar service.  There is a hatch from the servery to Clementhorpe, which was used for take-out sales, but is no longer in use.  At the rear of the pub, there are stairs up to first-floor accommodation, and down to the cellar.

Surviving features from the 1936 redesign include the fitted seats, terrazzo floor, bell pushes, and toilets.  It was made a Tetley's heritage pub in 1985 and was listed in 2010 following a campaign by the Campaign for Real Ale (CAMRA).  That organisation describes the pub as "one of the best preserved interiors of its kind in the country".

In 2009, CAMRA named The Swan its York Pub of the Year.  By 2017, the pub was owned by Punch Taverns.  That year, the landlord used the Pubs Code Regulations 2016 to move from being a tied house to operating on a market rent-only basis.  In 2020, the pub was one of fourteen in the city to appear in the Good Beer Guide.

See also

The Black Swan, York, a pub on Peasholme Green in York city centre

References

Buildings and structures completed in 1861
Grade II listed pubs in York
National Inventory Pubs